Kaligandaki  is an Indian Malayalam language television mega thriller drama series. The show premiered on general entertainment channel Amrita TV from13 February 2017 from 08:00 - 08:30 pm IST (Monday - Friday) . Prominent malayalam television film actors Madhupal, Dhanya Mary Varghese, Kiran Aravind, Aravind Mohan , V.K.Baiju, Krishnan Balakrishnan, Neeraja Das, Vindhuja Vikraman appeared in the lead roles of the TV series.

Plot 
The plot focuses on a beautiful girl named Ramunni, who is fond of paintings. Ramunni is given a job as a caretaker of a building that houses old paintings. One day she is found murdered and the police try to find out her murderer which forms the rest of the story.

Cast                   

 Madhupal
 Dhanya Mery Varghese
 Kiran Aravind
 Neeraja Das
 Vindhuja Vikraman
 Aravind Mohan
 Krishnan Balakrishnan as Guard Nakulan
 V.K Baiju
 Abhilash Vijay as Driver Shekharan

Awards and Reception 
26th Kerala State Television Awards (2017)

Kaligandaki was nominated and won 6 out of 28 awards of the Kerala State Television Awards, an award given by the Government of Kerala for best tv series and shows.

The detailed award breakdown is as given below:-

Best Director : Madhupal

Best Story writer : G.R Indugopan

Best Cameraman : Noushad Sherif

Best music director : Kallara Gopan

Best art director :  Ajith Krishnan

Best male dubbing artist : R.Radhakrishnan

References 

2017 Indian television series debuts